This is a list of alleged sightings of unidentified flying objects or UFOs in Mexico.

1883 

 On August 12, 1883, the astronomer José Bonilla reported that he saw "more than 300 dark, unidentified objects crossing before the Sun" while observing sunspot activity at Zacatecas Observatory in Mexico. He took a number of wet-plate photographs at 1/100 of a second exposure. Although it was later found that the objects were actually high-flying geese, Bonilla is usually given the distinction of having taken the earliest photo of an "unidentified flying object", with some UFOlogical literature interpreting the photographs as either alien spacecraft or an unsolved mystery.

1974
 According to UFOlogists, local residents reported a mid-air collision between a UFO and a small airplane near the town of Coyame on August 25, 1974, followed by a military investigation and cover-up. However historians say that such "UFO reports" were likely prompted by the 1974 crash and military recovery of a Cessna aircraft involved in drug trafficking.

2004 
On Friday, March 5, Mexican Air Force pilots using infrared equipment to search for drug-smuggling aircraft recorded 11 unidentified objects over southern Campeche. Mexico’s Defense Department issued a press release on May 12 accompanied by videotape that showed moving bright lights at 11,500 feet. Mexican UFOlogist Jaime Maussan interpreted the videotape as "proof of alien visitation", but science writer and skeptic Michael Shermer was critical of witness accounts that "varied wildly", saying, "it was like a fisherman's tale, growing with each retelling", while other experts suggested the lights were most likely burn-off flares on offshore  oil platforms in the Gulf of Mexico.

See also 
 List of reported UFO sightings
 UFO Over Pyramids in Mexico

References

External links 
 MUFON - Last 20 UFO Sightings and Pictures

Mexico
Historical events in Mexico